Main Hoon Na is a 2004 Indian Hindi-language action comedy written and directed by Farah Khan in her directorial debut. The film stars Shah Rukh Khan, Sushmita Sen, Sunil Shetty, Amrita Rao and Zayed Khan, and follows Major Ram Sharma, who is sent on a undercover mission as a university student to protect a general's daughter from a dangerous rogue soldier.

The film began development in 2001, and faced a number of delays during production. Main Hoon Na is notable for approaching the Indo-Pakistani conflict from a neutral perspective. It was filmed at St. Paul's School and the surrounding state of West Bengal. The film is also the first produced and distributed by Red Chillies Entertainment, and is produced by Gauri Khan. 

Initially scheduled for release in 2003, Main Hoon Na released on 30 April 2004 and received positive reviews from critics. It proved to be a major commercial success at the box office, grossing ₹84 crore, thus becoming the second highest-grossing Indian film of 2004, only surpassed by another Shah Rukh Khan-starrer Veer-Zaara.

At the 50th Filmfare Awards, Main Hoon Na received 12 nominations, including Best Film, Best Director (Farah), Best Actor (Shah Rukh), Best Supporting Actress (Rao), Best Supporting Actor (Zayed) and Best Villain (Shetty), winning Best Music Director (Anu Malik).

Plot 
Over an attempt to de-escalate tensions between the two nations, India and Pakistan launch Project Milaap, a prisoner exchange program. Raghavan Dutta, a former Indian special forces soldier discharged for murdering Pakistani citizens in revenge for the murder of his son, fires a shot at Gen. Bakshi, but Brigadier Shekhar Sharma takes the bullet at a press conference. Raghavan runs a militant group with a former comrade Captain Khan, set against peace between the two rival countries. On his deathbed, Shekhar informs his son, fellow soldier Major Ram, of his other son Lakshman, and asks Ram to reconcile with his family as they had separated very long ago because Shekhar had cheated on his wife with Ram's mother. 

Meanwhile, Ram's boss, Gen. Bakshi, sends him undercover to protect his daughter Sanjana, who studies at St Pauls College in Darjeeling. Ram is initially hesitant to go there but agrees when Bakshi informs him that Lakshman also studies there. Ram finds it tough to adjust to college life because he is much older than everyone else. He encounters Sanjana and her love interest Lucky but both don't want to know him for this reason. Another college student helps Ram hack the college computer to find out who Lakshman is, only to find that Lucky is in fact Lakshman. During a marathon, Lakshman is saved from falling off the university's roof by Ram. The two of them and Sanjana then become friends, and Ram moves in with Lakshman and his mother, Madhu. 

Outside a cinema, Ram saves his classmate, Percy, from an assassination attempt by Khan; Ram captures him, but his own true identity is found out by Raghavan, who arrives at the university masquerading as a teacher. Ram also brings Madhu and Lakshman closer by helping them bond during his stay there. Ram falls in love with his chemistry professor, Chandni, while Lakshman falls in love with Sanjana (after Ram and Chandni give her a makeover). At prom, Raghavan orders a kidnapping on Chandni, but she is saved by Ram. After meeting with Sanjana, Ram requests Raghavan to drop the pair to her father at her hostel, where Sanjana reconciles with her father. After this night, Sanjana and Chandni discover Ram's true identity. 

Raghavan reveals Ram's true identity to Lakshman and his mother and when they confront him, Ram informs them that his father's last wish implored him to reconcile with his family. As they are not ready to accept him yet, Ram leaves their home and the university. Raghavan then holds the university hostage, demanding the cancelation of Project Milaap. Upon being informed, Ram immediately returns to the university. Before fully entering the hostage situation, he encounters Madhu and apologizes. Knowing what he's about to do, she accepts him as a son. Accompanying Khan, Ram enters the building, and is subsequently shot by Khan. Ram survives, changes Khan's mind about his allegiances, and proceeds to kill the guards, thus freeing the students. 

Raghavan shoots Khan dead at point blank range for his betrayal. A fight ensues between Ram and Raghavan and Ram kills Raghavan by removing the safety pin from Raghavan's hand grenade. Lakshman helps Ram escape from the ensuing explosion from aboard a helicopter and the two happily embrace as brothers. Meanwhile, Project Milaap is a success and all the prisoners are exchanged triumphantly. Ram and Lakshman go and immerse their father's ashes together, as Madhu tearfully looks on. Finally, Lakshman is allowed to graduate alongside Ram and the entire university rejoice.

Cast 
Shah Rukh Khan as Major Ram Prasad Sharma
Zayed Khan as Laxman "Lucky" Prasad Sharma: Sanju's love interest.
Amrita Rao as Sanjana "Sanju" Bakshi: General Amarjeet's daughter, and Laxman's love interest.
Sushmita Sen as Chandni Chopra: Ram, Sanjana and Laxman's chemistry teacher and Ram's love interest.
Sunil Shetty as Ex- Major Raghavan Datta 
Boman Irani as Yogendra "Yogi" Agarwal, College Principal: who is very forgetful. 
Kirron Kher as Madhu Sharma: Ram's stepmother and Lucky's mother.
Murali Sharma as Ex-Captain Khan: Raghavan's second-in-command.
Kunal Kumar as Baman: A student who helps Ram hack into university's students' list to search for Lucky.
Kabir Bedi as General Amarjeet Bakshi: Sanju's father, and Ram's superior officer.
Naseeruddin Shah as Brig. Shekhar Prasad Sharma: Ram and Lucky's father. (special appearance) 
Bindu as Mrs. Sonali Kakkar: the Hindi teacher who is very bad at speaking English.
Satish Shah as Professor Madhav Rasai: the Physics teacher who spits while speaking, and is very short-tempered.
Rakhi Sawant as Mini: a flirtatious student.
Praveen Sirohi as Vivek: a jock student.
 Nassar Abdullah as Rajat Saxena: Project Milaap's TV host.
Tabu as Aparna: A girl watching Ram's dance rehearsal (uncredited cameo)
Geeta Kapoor as girl dancing in song "Gori Gori" (cameo)
Sajid Khan as band member in song "Gori Gori"

Production

Development

The film was planned by Farah Khan and Shahrukh Khan in 2001. The shooting of the film had to begin in October 2001 but later that year, Shahrukh Khan got badly injured while shooting an action sequence for Shakti: The Power (2002) due to which he suffered pain in filming for his other projects. He was later sent to the UK for treatment and the film was subsequently shelved. The film was later revived in 2003 after Shahrukh Khan came back from the UK; Farah Khan wanted to name it The Outsider. After some of her friends suggested that the title she wants matches that of a 1983 Hollywood film, she finalized the title Main Hoon Na for the film though Shahrukh Khan was unhappy at that time with the title, thinking the title was incomplete, but later changed his mind after listening to the recording of the film's title song.

Casting

At a time when the film was revived in 2003, Hrithik Roshan, Farhan Akhtar, and Sohail Khan were considered for Lucky's role. Due to unknown reasons, none of the three accepted the film; Zayed Khan was later signed. Ameesha Patel was offered Sanju's role but rejected the character due to date issues, as did then-newcomer Ayesha Takia when she was also approached who also declined, after which Amrita Rao was finalized for the role.

Shah Rukh Khan asked Farah Khan to approach Kamal Haasan, suggesting that Haasan owed him a favor for his role in Hey Ram (2000). Haasan heard the script but turned down the role citing that it would portray him as an anti-national.

Reception
Main Hoon Na received positive reviews from critics, who praised its direction, action sequences. humor, soundtrack and cast performances.

Critical reception
Taran Adarsh praised the film for being funny, emotional and full of action, describing it as "a wholesome entertainer that has something for everyone."

Jamie Russell wrote in his review in the BBC, "A bonkers 'masala' movie, Main Hoon Na could be the mutant offspring of Grease (1978) and The Matrix (1999). Part-thriller, part high-school comedy and all Bollywood musical, it's the directorial debut of Farah Khan."

Box office 
Main Hoon Na was the second-highest grossing Indian film of 2004 behind Veer-Zaara (also a Shahrukh Khan-starrer set against India-Pakistan backdrop). It made  in India and an additional  in the overseas market.

Soundtrack 

The music was composed by Anu Malik. The lyrics were provided by Javed Akhtar. The soundtrack earned Malik his second Filmfare Award for Best Music Director. According to the Indian trade website Box Office India, with around 2.1 million units sold, the film's soundtrack album was the one of the highest selling Bollywood soundtracks of the year. Sonu Nigam received several award nominations and won an MTV Immies Best Male Playback Singer Award.

Track listing

Awards and nominations

Remake
In 2008, the film was remade in Tamil and released as Aegan.

References

External links 

Red Chillies Entertainment films
2004 films
Films about terrorism in India
Films directed by Farah Khan
2000s Hindi-language films
Films about hostage takings
Indian Army in films
Indian coming-of-age films
India–Pakistan relations in popular culture
2000s masala films
Indian teen comedy films
Films set in Darjeeling
Films scored by Anu Malik
Hindi films remade in other languages
2004 directorial debut films